Nash Owen Walters (born May 18, 1997) is an American professional baseball pitcher in the Los Angeles Angels organization. He made his MLB debut in 2022 for the Los Angeles Angels.

Career

Milwaukee Brewers
Walters graduated from Lindale High School in Lindale, Texas. He committed to attend Texas A&M University on a college baseball scholarship. The Milwaukee Brewers selected Walters in the third round, with the 90th overall selection, in the 2015 MLB draft. He signed with the Brewers.

Los Angeles Angels
The Brewers traded Walters to the Los Angeles Angels on September 4, 2022. The Angels added him to their 40-man roster and optioned him to the Salt Lake Bees of the Class AAA Pacific Coast League.

Walters made his major league debut on October 5, 2022, pitching against the Oakland Athletics.

On November 15, 2022, Walters was designated for assignment. On November 18, he was non tendered and became a free agent. He re-signed a minor league deal on December 14, 2022.

References

External links

1997 births
Living people
Arizona League Brewers players
Baseball players from Texas
Biloxi Shuckers players
Helena Brewers players
Indios de Mayagüez players
Los Angeles Angels players
Major League Baseball pitchers
Nashville Sounds players
Salt Lake Bees players
Sportspeople from Tyler, Texas
Wisconsin Timber Rattlers players